is a district of Chiyoda, Tokyo, Japan. It was in the former ward of Kōjimachi, which existed in Tokyo until 1947.

Etymology
Iidabashi is named after a nearby bridge called Iida Bridge (Iidabashi), itself named after an Edo-period farmer, Iida Kihee (Iida Kihee).

Places
Iidabashi Station
Iida Bridge
Kanda River

Economy

Several companies have their headquarters in Iidabashi, among them Japan Freight Railway Company, KDDI Nikken Sekkei, and Shohakusha.

Education
 operates public elementary and junior high schools. Fujimi Elementary School (富士見小学校) is the zoned elementary school for Iidabashi 1-4 chōme. There is a freedom of choice system for junior high schools in Chiyoda Ward, and so there are no specific junior high school zones.

References

Districts of Chiyoda, Tokyo